John Howell (1914–1993) was a British art director who worked as production designer designing the sets for a number of films.

Selected filmography

 Journey Together (1945)
 Fame Is the Spur (1947)
 Brighton Rock (1948)
 The Guinea Pig (1948)
 Private Angelo (1949)
 The Dancing Years (1950)
 Happy Go Lovely (1951)
 Saturday Island (1952)
 Treasure Hunt (1952)
 Malta Story (1953)
 The Net (1953)
 Forbidden Cargo (1954)
 Fast and Loose (1954)
 Simba (1955)
 Three Men in a Boat (1956)
 Loser Takes All (1956)
 The Baby and the Battleship (1956)
 Bhowani Junction (1956)
 Nor the Moon by Night (1958)
 Orders to Kill (1958)
 Swiss Family Robinson (1960)
 A Weekend with Lulu (1961)
 We Joined the Navy (1962)
 Guns of Darkness (1962)
 The Mouse on the Moon (1963)
 Man in the Middle (1964)
 A High Wind in Jamaica (1965)
 Khartoum (1966)
 Where the Spies Are (1966)
 The Deadly Affair (1967)
 Casino Royale (1967)
 Hammerhead (1968)
 Don't Raise the Bridge, Lower the River (1968)
 The Prime of Miss Jean Brodie (1969)
 There's a Girl in My Soup (1970)
 Soft Beds, Hard Battles (1974)

References

Bibliography
 Holston, Kim R. Movie Roadshows: A History and Filmography of Reserved-Seat Limited Showings, 1911-1973. McFarland, 2012.
 Ryall, Tom. Anthony Asquith. Manchester University Press, 2005.

External links

1914 births
1993 deaths
People from London
British art directors